Arteaga may refer to:

Arteaga, Coahuila, city in Mexico
Arteaga Municipality, Michoacán, city in Mexico
Arteaga (surname)
Arteaga (footballer, born 1969), Spanish footballer

See also
Gautegiz Arteaga, town in Biscay province of Spain
Arteaga (footballer) (disambiguation)